Holtzmann's law is a Proto-Germanic sound law originally noted by Adolf Holtzmann in 1838. It is also known by its traditional German name Verschärfung (literally: "sharpening"). (A similar sound law which has affected modern Faroese, called skerping in Faroese itself, is also known as "Faroese Verschärfung" in English.)

Description and occurrences
 hardening into occlusive onsets:
 / in North Germanic;
 / in East Germanic
 vocalization of the first semivowel, its addition to a diphthong, and division of the diphthong and remaining semivowel into two separate segments in West Germanic.
The process is brought about by the fact that vowels (or semivowels) in the syllable margin are invariably transformed into consonantal articulations.

The conditions of the sound change were long debated, since there was a seemingly random distribution of affected and unaffected words. At first, dependence on word accent was assumed, parallel to Verner's Law. One currently accepted solution, first proposed by Smith (1941), postulates dependency on the presence of a PIE laryngeal, which when lost, triggered lengthening as if the semivowels were vowels, and forced them into the syllable margin.

For example, PIE * → early Proto-Germanic *trewwjaz 'trustworthy, faithful' →:  
 *triwwjaz: Old Norse tryggr, Gothic triggws
 *triuwjaz: Old English trēowe, Old High German gitriuwi.

 with hardening:
 *: Crimean Gothic  (pl.) (* (sg.) < *)
 *: Old Norse egg
 with diphthongization:
 *: German Ei, Old English

Alternative views 
Some linguists (e.g. Joseph Voyles) hold that Holtzmann's Law represents two separate and independent sound changes, one applying to Gothic and another to Old Norse, rather than being a common innovation. This is supported by James Marchand's observation that a Runic inscription (niuwila on the Naesbjaerg bracteate of the 5th century) and an early loan into Finnic (*kuva 'picture', cf. Gothic skuggwa 'mirror', Old High German skūwo 'look') do not exhibit this change. If true, this would prevent Holtzmann's law being used as an example of early Gotho-Nordic unity, in which context it is often cited. Voyles's explanations of the changes do not involve laryngeal theory.

Similar developments in later Nordic languages 
Faroese shows a similar development, where some Old Norse long vowels developed into diphthongs, which then hardened into stops, e.g. Old Norse þrír → Faroese tríggir, ON róa → Far. rógva. This phenomenon is commonly called "Faroese Verschärfung" or by the Faroese term skerping ("sharpening"), which, however, also is used about the fronting of vowels that subsequently takes place in these contexts. Another similar change occurs in a number of Jutlandic dialects of Danish, where high vowels carrying the stød prosody develop diphthongal glides which are then "hardened" into stops or fricatives, a phenomenon commonly called "klusilspring" ("stop shifting") or "klusilparasit" ("stop parasite").

See also 
Northwest Germanic
Grimm's law

Notes

References
 William M. Austin, Germanic Reflexes of Indo-European -Hy- and -Hw-, Language (1958), 203–211.
 Kuryƚowicz, J. "The Germanic Verschärfung." Language 43, no. 2 (1967): 445–51. doi:10.2307/411544.
 Rowe, Charley, The problematic Holtzmann's Law in Germanic, Indogermanische Forschungen 108, (2003), 258–266.
L. C. Smith, What's all the fuss about 16 words? A new approach to Holtzmann's law Göttinger Beiträge zur Sprachwissenschaft 1.
L. C. Smith, Holtzmann's law: getting to the hart of the Germanic verscharfung, University of Calgary thesis,  (1997).

Sound laws
Germanic languages